Burning Fuse (French: Le feu aux poudres) is a 1957 French-Italian thriller film directed by Henri Decoin and starring Raymond Pellegrin, Charles Vanel and Peter van Eyck.  It was shot at the Billancourt Studios in Paris. The films sets were designed by the art director René Renoux.

Synopsis
Lola, the wife of a notorious arms dealer Pédro Wassevitch is attracted to a young painter Ludovic. Unknown to her he has been sent to infiltrate Wassevitch's operation which both a rival and the police are interested in.

Cast
 Raymond Pellegrin as Ludovic 'Ludo' Ferrier
 Charles Vanel as Albatrasse
 Peter van Eyck as Pédro Wassevitch
 Françoise Fabian as Lola Wassevitch
 Lino Ventura as Legentil
 Darío Moreno as Jeff
 Lyla Rocco as Brigitte
 Jacqueline Maillan as Mme Catherine, l'aubergiste
 Mathilde Casadesus as Mimi
 Pierre-Louis as L' inspecteur Fougeron
 Roland Armontel as Antoine
 Henri Cogan as Matt
 Michel Flamme as Un inspecteur
 Michel Jourdan as Dédé
 Pascal Mazzotti as Le pharmacien
 Georges Bayle
 François Chaumette as L'ingénieur du son
 Nino Crisman
 Le Hang
 Olivier Darrieux as Un inspecteur
 Lisa Jouvet as La serveuse
 Marthe Mercadier as L'aubergiste
 Albert Simonin as Albert

References

Bibliography
 Davidson, John & Hake, Sabine. Framing the Fifties: Cinema in a Divided Germany. Berghahn Books, 2007.

External links

1957 films
1950s thriller films
French thriller films
Italian thriller films
1950s French-language films
Films directed by Henri Decoin
Films with screenplays by Albert Simonin
1950s French films
1950s Italian films
Films shot at Billancourt Studios